Varmint is an album by American jazz vibraphonist Jason Adasiewicz, which was recorded in 2008 and released on Cuneiform. It was the second recording with his quintet Rolldown, featuring cornetist Josh Berman, saxophonist Aram Shelton, bassist Jason Roebke and drummer Frank Rosaly.

Reception

In his review for AllMusic, Michael G. Nastos states "The second recording for Jason Adasiewicz with his quintet Rolldown takes the band into a distinct modern jazz arena, sporting equal parts of straight-ahead mainstream pacings alongside the bold, inventive, improvisational music of latter and current day Chicago."

The Down Beat review by Bill Meyer says "Their second effort, Varmint, shows growth exactly where it was most needed. The compositions are better developed, the playing more relaxed and fluid, and the record better represents the quintet’s onstage spirit."

The All About Jazz review by Troy Collins states "An impressive follow-up to a solid debut, Varmint finds Adasiewicz growing as a composer and improviser, shedding his influences while discovering his voice."

In a review for JazzTimes Bill Milkowski notes "There are bracing solo contributions from cornetist Josh Berman and pungent-toned alto saxophonist Aram Shelton, while bassist Jason Roebke and drummer Frank Rosaly provide lightly swinging momentum throughout."<ref name="JazzTimes">Milkowski, Bill. [http://jazztimes.com/articles/25667-varmint-jason-adasiewicz-s-rolldown Varmint' review] at JazzTimes</ref>

In Point of Departure, Bill Shoemaker reviews the album combined with Josh Berman' Old Idea and concludes "They potentially have decades to refine this already remarkable partnership; at mid-century, these complementary albums may well be considered early milestones."

Track listingAll compositions by Jason Adasiewicz except as indicated''
 "Green Grass" – 6:02
 "Varmint" – 8:36
 "Dagger" – 7:16
 "Hide" – 7:54
 "I Hope She Is Awake" – 6:36
 "Punchbug" – 8:21
 "The Griots" (Andrew Hill) – 6:08

Personnel
Jason Adasiewicz - vibraphone
Josh Berman – cornet 
Aram Shelton – alto sax, clarinet
Jason Roebke – bass
Frank Rosaly – drums

References

2009 albums
Jason Adasiewicz albums
Cuneiform Records albums